The 1999 FIFA U-16 World Championship, the eighth edition of the tournament, was held in the cities of Auckland, Christchurch, Napier, and Dunedin in New Zealand between 10 and 27 November 1999. Players born after 1 January 1982 could participate in this tournament. This was the first FIFA tournament held in the Pacific Islands.

Venues

New Zealand's capital city Wellington was not allocated any matches as the city's only venue at the time– Athletic Park–was not deemed adequate by FIFA as a match venue.

Teams

1.Teams that made their debut.
2.Australia qualified for the tournament after two-leg playoff matches with 3rd Place winner of 1998 AFC U-17 Championship, Bahrain.

Squads

Group Stage

Group A

Group B

Group C

Group D

Knockout stage

Quarter-finals

Semi-finals

Playoff for 3rd place

Final

Winners

Awards

Goalscorers

Ishmael Addo of Ghana won the Golden Shoe award for scoring seven goals. In total, 93 goals were scored by 59 different players, with two of them credited as own goals.

7 goals
 Ishmael Addo
4 goals
 Leonardo Santiago
 Waleed Hamza
3 goals
 Bernard Dong Bortey
 Ibrahim Atiku
 Nathaniel Lamptey
 Alejandro Da Silva
 Aitor Gómez
 Landon Donovan
2 goals

 Mark Byrnes
 Scott McDonald
 Issaka Ouedraogo
 Hector Vallejo
 Dave Mulligan
 Daniel Ferreira
 Victor Cabrera
 Lukasz Madej
 Oguchi Onyewu
 Sergio Leal

1 goal

 Dylan MacAllister
 Joe Di Iorio
 Shane Cansdell-Sherriff
 Caca
 Carlos Henrique
 Marcos Roberto
 Djibril Compaoré
 Ibrahim Kabore
 Leonhard Haas
 Anthony Obodai
 Razak Pimpong
 Aarón Galindo
 Felix Grijalva
 Gustavo Ramirez
 Juan Estrada
 Yared Yanez
 Allan Pearce
 Diego Figueredo
 Tomas Guzman
 Walter Fretes
 Łukasz Mierzejewski
 Albert Crusat
 Ernesto
 Jonathan Aspas
 Mario
 Suriya Amatawech
 Abe Thompson
 DaMarcus Beasley
 Jordan Cila
 Kyle Beckerman
 Alvaro Meneses
 Horacio Peralta
 Miguel Lapolla
 Ruben Olivera
 Sebastian Alvarez
 Williams Martínez

Own goal
 Stephen Tetteh (playing against Brazil)
 Gonzalo Novegil (playing against Ghana)

Final ranking

External links
FIFA U-17 World Championship New Zealand 1999, FIFA.com
Technical Report (Part 1), (Part 2) and (Part 3)

FIFA U-17 World Championship
International association football competitions hosted by New Zealand
Fifa U-17 World Championship
FIFA U-17 World Cup tournaments
November 1999 sports events in New Zealand